Niklas Hartmann (born 9 December 1989) is a German footballer who plays for Hessen Kassel.

References

External links

1989 births
Living people
German footballers
Arminia Bielefeld players
Rot-Weiß Oberhausen players
2. Bundesliga players
3. Liga players
Association football goalkeepers
People from Hann. Münden
Footballers from Lower Saxony